Weston Rhyn is a civil parish in Shropshire, England.  It contains 21 listed buildings that are recorded in the National Heritage List for England.  Of these, three are listed at Grade II*, the middle of the three grades, and the others are at Grade II, the lowest grade. The parish contains the village of Weston Rhyn and the surrounding countryside.  The Llangollen Canal passes through the parish and the listed structures associated with it are an aqueduct and a road bridge.  Many of the other listed buildings are houses and associated structures, farmhouses and farm buildings, the earliest of which are timber framed or have timber framed cores.  The other listed buildings include a road bridge, two sets of limekilns, three milestones, a bee bole, a viaduct, a folly in the form of a stone circle, a church, a Sunday school, and a war memorial.


Key

Buildings

References

Citations

Sources

Lists of buildings and structures in Shropshire